Corey Dwight Benjamin (born February 24, 1978) is an American former professional basketball player who played in the NBA from 1998 to 2003.  He graduated from Fontana High School in Fontana, California, then played college basketball for Oregon State University, and was selected by the Chicago Bulls in the first round (28th overall) of the 1998 NBA Draft.

NBA career
Benjamin stayed with the Bulls for three seasons, and during the 2002–03 campaign, he signed a pair of 10-day contracts to play for the Atlanta Hawks. Between his stints with Chicago and Atlanta, he played for Sutor Montegranaro in Italy, and the Southern California Surf in the American Basketball Association. He also suited up for the North Charleston Lowgators in the NBDL (now known as the NBA G League).

Benjamin is also known for an incident where he mentioned to teammate Randy Brown that he could beat Michael Jordan in one-on-one game. Jordan had just retired, but he showed up at a Bulls practice to completely embarrass Benjamin in an 11–3 rout.

International career
Benjamin spent the final five years of his career playing abroad, first heading to France's Ligue Nationale de Basketball with Chalonnais for the 2003–04 season, followed by a stint in China for the Xinjiang Flying Tigers of the Chinese Basketball Association in 2004–05.

Heading to Latin America for the 2005–06 campaign, Benjamin next joined the Guaros de Lara in Venezuela's Liga Profesional de Baloncesto, followed by a spell in Puerto Rico's Baloncesto Superior Nacional with the Conquistadores de Guaynabo.

Benjamin then returned to Europe to play for Benfica in Portugal during the 2006–07 season. He wrapped up his overseas career with a second stint in Asia the following winter, going to South Korea to compete in the Korean Basketball League with the Daegu Orions.

Career statistics

NBA

|-
| align="left" | 1998–99
| align="left" | Chicago
| 31 || 1 || 10.3 || .376 || .214 || .675 || 1.3 || 0.3 || 0.4 || 0.3 || 3.8
|-
| align="left" | 1999–00
| align="left" | Chicago
| 48 || 10 || 18.0 || .414 || .348 || .598 || 1.8 || 1.1 || 0.6 || 0.5 || 7.7
|-
| align="left" | 2000–01
| align="left" | Chicago
| 65 || 5 || 13.2 || .381 || .259 || .675 || 1.5 || 1.1 || 0.4 || 0.2 || 4.7
|-
| align="left" | 2002–03
| align="left" | Atlanta
| 9 || 0 || 16.9 || .302 || .154 || .750 || 3.4 || 1.1 || 0.1 || 0.2 || 4.4
|- class="sortbottom"
| style="text-align:center;" colspan="2"| Career
| 153 || 16 || 14.3 || .390 || .289 || .652 || 1.7 || 0.9 || 0.5 || 0.3 || 5.5
|}

College

|-
| align="left" | 1996-97
| align="left" | Oregon State
| 23 || 17 || 26.1 || .432 || .315 || .653 || 4.0 || 1.3 || 1.1 || 0.5 || 14.9
|-
| align="left" | 1997–98
| align="left" | Oregon State
| 25 || 22 || 26.9 || .539 || .293 || .713 || 5.0 || 2.2 || 1.9 || 0.7 || 19.8
|- class="sortbottom"
| style="text-align:center;" colspan="2"| Career
| 48 || 39 || 26.5 || .491 || .305 || .688 || 4.5 || 1.8 || 1.5 || 0.6 || 17.5
|}

Personal life
While a member of the Oregon State Beavers, Benjamin played on the same team as his older brother, Sonny.

In 2000 Benjamin was arrested and charged with one count of domestic battery.  He was arrested again in 2016.

In 2021, Benjamin apologised after a video of his daughter punching another player 1/3 her size during a basketball game went viral.

References

External links
NBA.com bio

1978 births
Living people
American expatriate basketball people in China
American expatriate basketball people in France
American expatriate basketball people in Italy
American expatriate basketball people in Portugal
American expatriate basketball people in South Korea
American expatriate basketball people in Venezuela
Atlanta Hawks players
Basketball players from Compton, California
Charleston Lowgators players
Chicago Bulls draft picks
Chicago Bulls players
Élan Chalon players
Goyang Carrot Jumpers players
McDonald's High School All-Americans
Oregon State Beavers men's basketball players
Parade High School All-Americans (boys' basketball)
Shooting guards
S.L. Benfica basketball players
Xinjiang Flying Tigers players
American men's basketball players